Yao Kaka Aziawonou (born 30 November 1979) is a former Togolese football midfielder.

Club career
He also played for FC Nantes, FC Sion, FC Wangen bei Olten, FC Basel, FC Thun, Servette FC, BSC Young Boys, FC Luzern (on loan) and FC Winterthur.

International career
He was a member of the Togo national football team, and was called up to the 2006 World Cup.

External links

1979 births
Living people
Sportspeople from Lomé
Togolese footballers
Togolese expatriate footballers
Togo international footballers
Étoile Filante du Togo players
FC Nantes players
FC Sion players
FC Basel players
Servette FC players
FC Thun players
BSC Young Boys players
FC Luzern players
FC Winterthur players
FC Wangen bei Olten players
2000 African Cup of Nations players
2006 Africa Cup of Nations players
2006 FIFA World Cup players
Swiss Super League players
Expatriate footballers in Switzerland
Togolese expatriate sportspeople in Switzerland
Association football midfielders
21st-century Togolese people